Sinochasea is a genus of plants in the grass family. The only known species is Sinochasea trigyna, native to mountainous regions of Tibet, Qinghai, Nepal, Bhutan, Sikkim and Arunachal Pradesh.

References

Pooideae
Monotypic Poaceae genera
Flora of Asia